Betsy Nagelsen and Renáta Tomanová were the defending champions.

Seeds

Draw

External links
 1979 Australian Open – Women's draws and results at the International Tennis Federation

Women's Doubles
Australian Open (tennis) by year – Women's doubles